You have to win Zweikampf is the sixth studio album released by the German rock band Sportfreunde Stiller.  It was released on May 19, 2006, only a few weeks before the opening of the 2006 FIFA World Cup that was being hosted in Germany.  The album is a concept album focused around Association football.  Football has featured prominently in the band previous releases (cf. "10:1" on So wie einst Real Madrid), but this was their first album with solely football-related tracks.

While Herbert Grönemeyer's "Zeit, dass sich was dreht" was the official World Cup theme song, the single "'54, '74, '90, 2006" became a fan hymn for the German World Cup squad and was a number one hit in Germany.  The song commemorates German championships in the 1954, 1974, and 1990 World Cups. After Germany lost in the semi-final against Italy on July 4, 2006, the song was reworked as "'54, '74, '90, 2010" in anticipation of the 2010 FIFA World Cup in South Africa.

The title quotes Bixente Lizarazu.

Track listing 
 Unser Freund ist aus Leder ("Our Friend is Made of Leather")
 Pogo in Togo
 '54, '74, '90, 2006
 Eine Liebe, die nie endet ("A Love that Never Ends")
 Nix geht mehr ("Nothing More")
 Budenzauber ("Jamboree")
 Die Frisur von Björn Borg ("Björn Borg's hair")
 Dem Fritz sein Wetter
 Come Sara? ("How Will It Be?")
 Mag Tischtennis! ("We Like Table Tennis!")
 All die Schlachten, die wir schlagen ("All the Battles that We Propose")

2006 albums
Sportfreunde Stiller albums
Concept albums